Vanwyksdorp is a town in Kannaland Local Municipality in the Western Cape province of South Africa. Village on the Groot River, some 55 km south-east of Ladismith and 66 km north-east of Riversdale.

History
It was founded as a parish of the Dutch Reformed Church on the farm Buffelsfontein in 1904 and named after the Van Wyk family.

References

Populated places in the Kannaland Local Municipality